Pyotr Aleksandrovich Gitselov (born 18 July 1983) is a Russian-Swedish football manager and a former player. He manages Bodens BK.

Career

Club
During the summer of 2008, Gitselov joined FC Rostov on loan for the remainder of the 2008 season.

Personal life
He is the son of Aleksandr Gitselov, also a former footballer.

List of Awards
2002 – Won Superettan with Östers IF 
2005 – Got the award as the best player of Norrbotten (Swedish province) 
2008 – Won Russian Division 1 with FC Rostov 
2008 – Russian Premier League Champion with FC Rubin Kazan

References

External links
Profile at Rubin 
 

1983 births
Living people
Swedish footballers
Russian footballers
Russian emigrants to Sweden
Bodens BK players
Östers IF players
FC Rubin Kazan players
FC Rostov players
Association football midfielders
Russian Premier League players
Mjällby AIF players
FC Fakel Voronezh players
NK Rudeš players
Expatriate footballers in Croatia
Russian football managers